Golden Venus (French: La Vénus de l'or) is a 1938 French adventure film directed by Jean Delannoy and Charles Méré and starring Jacques Copeau, Daniel Lecourtois and Mireille Balin.

The film's sets were designed by the art director Robert Dumesnil.

Cast
In alphabetical order

References

Bibliography 
 Goble, Alan. The Complete Index to Literary Sources in Film. Walter de Gruyter, 1999.

External links 
 

1938 films
French adventure films
1938 adventure films
1930s French-language films
Films directed by Charles Méré
Films directed by Jean Delannoy
French black-and-white films
1930s French films